Aron Liechti (born 15 February 1986) is a Swiss football defender, who currently plays for FC Biel-Bienne.

References

1986 births
Living people
Swiss men's footballers
BSC Young Boys players
FC Biel-Bienne players
Association football fullbacks